This is a list of people from Ivory Coast.

Athletes
 Affoué Amandine Allou, sprinter
 Gregory Arkhurst, Olympic swimmer
 Louise Ayétotché, sprinter
 Mohamed Bengali, footballer
 Max Brito, Senegal-born former rugby union player
 Aruna Dindane, footballer for Lekhwiya
 Didier Drogba, retired footballer
 Emmanuel Eboué, retired footballer
 Gervinho, footballer for A.S. Roma
 Salomon Kalou, footballer for Lille OSC
 Arouna Koné, footballer for Lekhwiya
 Kolo Touré, footballer for Liverpool
 Yaya Touré, footballer for Manchester City
 Wilfried Bony. footballer for Swansea City A.F.C.
 Didier Zokora, footballer for Sevilla
 Seydou Doumbia, footballer for CSKA Moscow
 Yann Ekra, footballer for Harrisburg City Islanders

Clergymen/Religious leaders
 Bernard Agré

Artists/Designers

Soum Bill, singer
Frédéric Bruly Bouabré (aka Cheik Nadro), artist
Alpha Blondy, international singer
Joana Choumali, photographer 
Charles Dago, photographer
Ananias Leki Dago, photographer 
Claudie Titty Dimbeng, abstract painter
Tiken Jah Fakoly, singer
Gauz, photographer 
Emile Guebehi, sculptor
Ahmadou Kourouma, novelist
Laetitia Ky, artist
Mathile Moraeau, painter
Valérie Oka, artist
O'Plérou, graphic designer
Malick Sidibe, photographer
Paul Sika, photographer

Politicians and leaders
 Noel Ahipeaud
 Daniel Aka Ahizi, Minister of Environment, Water, and Forestry (2006–)
 Simeon Aké
 Laurent Akoun, Secretary General of the Ivorian Popular Front
 Pierre Djédji Amondji, Governor of Abidjan
Paulette Badjo Ezouehu, former Minister of Human Rights and Public Liberties
 Youssouf Bakayoko, current Minister of Foreign Affairs
 Charles Konan Banny, former prime minister (2005–2007)
 Henri Konan Bédié, former president (1993–1999)
 Félix Houphouët-Boigny, first president of Ivory Coast
 Ibrahim Coulibaly, former army sergeant and rebel leader
 Henriette Diabaté, former Minister of Culture (1990–1993, 2000), former Minister of Justice (2003–05) and current Secretary-General of the RDR (1999–)
 Seydou Diarra, former prime minister (2000, 2003–2005)
 Félix Doh, former rebel leader and leader of the MPIGO
 Daniel Kablan Duncan, former prime minister (1993–1999)
 Amara Essy, diplomat and former Permanent Representative of Ivory Coast to the United Nations (1981–1990)
 Laurent Gbagbo, former president of Ivory Coast (2000–2010)
 Simone Gbagbo, wife of Laurent Gbagbo and member of the Ivorian Popular Front
 Charles Blé Goudé, political leader
 Robert Guéï, former military leader
 Marie Koré, Independence protestor and national hero.
Ramata Ly-Bakayoko, former Minister of Higher Education and Scientific Research (2016–2018), Minister of Women, Families, and Children (2018–)
 Alassane Ouattara, former prime minister, current president of the Republic of Ivory Coast (2010–)
 Guillaume Soro, current prime minister of Ivory Coast (2007–)
 Anne Gnahouret Tatret, politician and diplomat

Writers

 Angèle Bassolé-Ouédraogo, poet and journalist
 Micheline Coulibaly, Vietnam-born children's books writer
 Bernard Binlin Dadié, novelist, playwright and poet
 Agnès Kraidy, journalist
 Marguerite Abouet, writer of graphic novel Aya

Other
Mireille Dosso (born 1952), virologist
 Ouattara Lagazane
Loza Maléombho, fashion designer
 Herve Lamizana
 Bamba Mamadou
 Ibrahim Meité
 René Djédjémel Mélédjé
 Léon Emmanuel Monnet
 Éric Pacôme N'Dri
 Célestine N'Drin
 Alain Ngalani
 Clement N'Goran
 Michel Amani N'Guessan
 Pascal Affi N'Guessan
 Aboubakar Diaby Ouattara
 Alassane Ouattara
 Véronique Tadjo
 Gabriel Tiacoh
 Frank Waota
 Francis Wodié
 Jean-Olivier Zirignon
 SJ(67)

See also
List of people by nationality

References